Krvna osveta is the first studio album of Montenegrin rapper Dvorska Luda. It was released in 2007.

Track listing 
"Prva krv" – 4:28
"Knock knock" – 4:08
"Mentalni kavez" - 3:36
"Uspavana dolina" - 3:58
"Kriza identiteta" - 3:21
"Stočarski manifest" - 4:38
"Plašiš li se mraka" - 3:46
"I" - 1:48
"II" - 1:53
"III" - 2:06
"Rat se nastavlja..." - 0:47
"Betta show respect" - 3:13
Guest musician: Diego the General
First verse: Dvorska Luda
Second verse: Diego the General
"Iskušenje svijesti" - 3:41
Guest musician: Darzee
First verse: Darzee
Second verse: Dvorska Luda
"Punchline the system" - 2:25
"Elektro šok" - 3:31
"Bolesna pjesma" - 2:57
"Neprijatelj repPpublike broj 1" - 3:19
"Pogodi ko sam ja" - 4:04
"Egzekucija" - 4:12
"Zadnje riječi" - 5:46

2007 albums
Dvorska Luda albums